Lover of Life, Singer of Songs (with the subtitle The Very Best of Freddie Mercury Solo) is a compilation album of Freddie Mercury's solo songs. It was released (except in the U.S.) on 4 September 2006, the day before Mercury's 60th Birthday. It was released on 21 November 2006 in the U.S, three days before the 15th anniversary of Mercury's death.

Content
The album was released in both a single disc and limited edition double disc format. A 2-disc DVD was released to accompany the CD. The DVD contained "The Untold Story" documentary on Disc 1, and various music videos on Disc 2.

Singles
The song Love Kills [Sunshine People Remix], remixed by Blank & Jones, was released as a single.

CD track listing

 Notes
  signifies a remix producer

DVD track listing

Disc one
 "The Untold Story" documentary
 "The Making Of 'The Untold Story'"

Disc two
 "Barcelona"
 "The Great Pretender" [Original 1987 Single Version]
 "I Was Born to Love You"
 "Time"
 "How Can I Go On"
 "Made in Heaven"
 "Living on My Own"
 "The Golden Boy"
 "In My Defence" [Re-Edit 2000]
 "Barcelona" [Live Version]
 "The Great Pretender" [Extended Version]
 "Living on My Own" ['93 Remix]
 A View Forever (Unveiling Of The Freddie Statue)
 "A Winters Tale"
 "Who Wants To Live Forever"
 "Love Me Like There's No Tomorrow"

Charts

Album

DVD

Certifications and sales

References

Freddie Mercury albums
2006 greatest hits albums
2006 video albums
2006 remix albums
Music video compilation albums
EMI Records remix albums
EMI Records video albums
EMI Records compilation albums
Video albums published posthumously
Compilation albums published posthumously
Remix albums published posthumously